Song Sang-hyun (born 21 December 1941) is a South Korean lawyer and former President of the International Criminal Court (ICC).

Biography
Song attended Seoul National University Law School, graduating with an LL.B. in 1963.  He attended Tulane University Law School as a Fulbright Fellow, then obtained a Diploma in Comparative Legal Studies from the University of Cambridge and a J.S.D. from Cornell Law School.

He has lectured Melbourne Law School, Harvard Law School, New York University and Seoul National University Law School.

In February 2003 he was elected to the first-ever bench of ICC judges, for a three-year term.  He took office on 11 March 2003 and was assigned to the Appeals Division.  He was re-elected to the court in 2006, for a term of nine years.  On 11 March 2009, he was elected President of the court.

He has been awarded Cornell University's Distinguished Alumni Medal, the Korean Federal Bar Association's Legal Culture Award, and the National Decoration of Moran Order from the Korean Government.

Lectures
 The International Criminal Court at a Glance in the Lecture Series of the United Nations Audiovisual Library of International Law
 The International Criminal Court: Maintaining Judicial Independence in a Political World in the Lecture Series of the United Nations Audiovisual Library of International Law
 Participation of Victims at the International Criminal Court in the Lecture Series of the United Nations Audiovisual Library of International Law

References

1941 births
Living people
20th-century South Korean lawyers
Seoul National University School of Law alumni
Tulane University Law School alumni
Cornell Law School alumni
Alumni of Wolfson College, Cambridge
Presidents of the International Criminal Court
South Korean judges of international courts and tribunals
South Korean legal scholars
Academic staff of Seoul National University
21st-century South Korean judges
International law scholars